Events of the year 2022 in Armenia.

Incumbents 
 President: Armen Sarkissian (until 1 February), Alen Simonyan (from 1 February to 13 March, acting President), Vahagn Khachaturyan (from 13 March)
 Prime Minister: Nikol Pashinyan

Events

Ongoing
 COVID-19 pandemic in Armenia

January 
 1 January – Armenia lifts its embargo on Turkey.
 11 January – 2021–2022 Armenia–Azerbaijan border crisis: Three Armenian soldiers and one Azerbaijani soldier are killed in a shootout at the border town of Verin Shorzha, Gegharkunik Province.
 23 January – President Armen Sarkissian resigned, replaced by Alen Simonyan as acting president.

February 
 4–20 February – 6 athletes from Armenia competed at the 2022 Winter Olympics.

March 
 13 March – Vahagn Khachaturyan is sworn in as President of Armenia.

April 
 25 April – Start of protests demanding the resignation of Prime Minister Nikol Pashinyan.

June 
 19 June – The protests came to an end after the opposition failed to achieve popular support.

July 
 10 July – International Biology Olympiad held in Yerevan between 10–18 July.

August 
 14 August – 2022 Yerevan explosion.

September 
 5 September – Starmus Festival held in Yerevan.
 12–14 September – September 2022 Armenia–Azerbaijan clashes

October 
 20 October – The European Union Monitoring Capacity to Armenia begins operations.
 21 October – The OSCE Needs Assessment Team in Armenia begins operations.

December 
 11 December – The Junior Eurovision Song Contest 2022 was held in Yerevan at the Karen Demirchyan Sports and Concerts Complex, and was won by French singer Lissandro.
 12 December – Start of a blockade in Artsakh.
 20 December – The EU Planning Assistance Team in Armenia becomes active.

Deaths

January 
 11 January – Razmik Davoyan, Armenian poet (born 1940).
 24 January – Vachik Mangassarian, Armenian actor (born 1943), complications from COVID-19.

February 
 4 February – Arthur Grigoryan, Armenian composer (born 1958).

See also
 History of Armenia
 Index of Armenia-related articles
 List of Armenia-related topics
 Outline of Armenia

References

Notes

Citations

 
2020s in Armenia
Years of the 21st century in Armenia
Armenia
Armenia
Armenia